Barbara Goette (26 July 1908 – 23 October 1997) was a German academic. She lived in Germany and then Australia. From 1935 to 1943, she was the private secretary of Ludwig Roselius, creator of Böttcherstraße and Café HAG, and financier of Focke-Wulf.

Early life 

Barbara Goette matriculated in Kassel in 1928 and began studying mathematics, physics and philosophy at Freiburg University and then Kiel where she took her state examinations in 1934-35. She met Dr. Ludwig Roselius through the marriage of her brother to his youngest daughter. He suggested she work for the concern. Goette became his companion, carer, confidante and collaborator.

Career 
In September 1936 during a meeting in Berlin, the Reichsluftfahrtministerium (German Aviation Ministry) recommended reconstruction of Focke-Wulf with 50% going to the state and 50% to a large electronics concern.

A short time later the Roselius conglomerate became majority shareholder with 46% and Lorenz (ITT) secured 27.8%. The aircraft company was reconstituted as Focke-Wulf Flugzeugbau GmbH. Goette was instrumental in assisting with this and the Böttcherstrasse was reclassified as 'degenerate art'. Roselius survived and consequently had the new FW 200 Condor fitted with 26 passenger seats (she was born on the 26th), safeguarding her legacy, in 1937.

After Dr. Roselius died in May 1943, Goette lectured in English at the Humboldt Hochschule in Berlin until the premises were demolished during a bombing raid. In 1944 she started her Ph.D. in philosophy at Kiel. There she met Dr. J. P. Leidig, whom she married in February 1945. Shortly after the war she acted as an interpreter for the military police in Gunzenhausen, Bavaria.

In 1950 the family settled in Adelaide, Australia. Dr. Leidig died in 1957 and Goette was left with two sons. She never remarried and taught mathematics at Woodlands Church of England Girls Grammar School for 23 years. One year she had 4 of the top 10 students in South Australia in her class. She received a congratulatory call from the Adelaide University Mathematics Department. She worked as mathematics teacher until she was 81 at the Muirden College matriculation centre.

A comprehensive posthumous interview by the Australian Our Time channel 44 program (episode 188) on her life was broadcast in 2015.

Publications 

While employed by the Roselius concern, Goette wrote many articles on Dr. Roselius including, 'Ludwig Roselius creates the Böttcherstraße' and 'Politics and Propaganda'. An unpublished essay 'Ludwig the Philosopher' appears in the book that her son wrote with Kevin Lower as researcher and Karen Collins as main editor. This book is a biography dealing primarily with Goette's life in Germany during the Third Reich. A massive dose of digitalis was allegedly injected by Hitler's henchmen into Roselius on 15 May 1943 in the Hotel Kaiserhof (Berlin). On 26 May 1944 Goette travelled to Bad Eilsen to meet with Focke-Wulf aircraft designer and engineer Professor Kurt Tank in order to obtain his written contribution for a memorial publication on Roselius' life. Reichsführer Heinrich Himmler saw her English books at Mittersill Castle in Austria and the Gestapo launched an investigation in August 1944. Goette conducted extensive WWII correspondence with Senator Alfred Faust and in 1998 the Bremen State Archives purchased 80 original items from Ludwig Leidig in Australia. Mitzi Bergel was Goette's best friend in Australia and every year Goette hosted a Christmas party in North Adelaide attended mostly by Jewish friends.

In 1944 Goette risked her life by writing the things that had infuriated Hitler in 1936 while attacking Dr. Roselius and the Böttcherstrasse at the September Nuremberg Party Rally. This ten page essay was approved in September 1944 and was eventually published by the Bremen Yearbook in 1951 and is included in the reference section. The controversial aspects were:
 The Paula Becker-Modersohn museum which was the first museum in the world dedicated to a female artist and labelled 'degenerate art' by the Nazis.
 The 'Tree of Life' by Bernhard Hoetger depicting a Nordic sacrifice.
 Hoetger's architecture again 'degenerate'.
In late 1935 the SS newspaper Das Schwarze Korps launched a vitriolic attack on Roselius' Böttcherstrasse.

References 

1908 births
1997 deaths
Mathematics educators
German emigrants to Australia